Choibalsan is the fourth-largest city in Mongolia after Ulaanbaatar, Darkhan, and Erdenet. The name of the city was Bayan Tümen until 1941, when it was renamed after the communist leader Khorloogiin Choibalsan in honor of the 20th anniversary of the Mongolian Revolution of 1921. It is the capital of the province of Dornod.

History 

The location has been a post on a trading route for centuries. In the 19th century it grew into a city, and became the economic hub of eastern Mongolia in the twentieth century and is still serving as an active economic center for Eastern Mongolia.

Due to the city's proximity to the site of the Battle of Khalkhin Gol, it contains a museum dedicated to Georgy Zhukov, hero of the battle.

Population 
The city of Choibalsan has a population of 45,490 (1994), 41,714 (2000), 36,142 (2003), 39,500 (2006), 39,500 (2007, 53.2% of the Dornod Aimag's total population), 38,150 (2008 51.2% of the Aimag's population).

Choibalsan is inhabited primarily by Halh Mongols, with smaller numbers of Buryats, Barga Mongols, and Üzemchin. There is also a minority of immigrants from China who now constitutes the only China Town in Mongolia outside Ulaanbaatar.

Climate
Choibalsan experiences a cold semi-arid climate (Köppen BSk) with frigid, very dry winters and warm, wetter summers. In terms of temperatures it resembles a humid continental climate (Dfb), but falls short of that classification due to the very dry winters.

Transportation 
The Choibalsan Airport (COQ/ZMCD) has one paved runway, and is served by regular flights to Ulaanbaatar, and Hailar and Manzhouli in Inner Mongolia, China.

References 

Aimag centers
Populated places in Mongolia